Matt Hoverman is an American actor and playwright based in Los Angeles.

He writes witty comedies for television (Daytime Emmy Award for Outstanding Writing in an Animated Program), the theatre (FringeNYC Award for Outstanding Playwriting) and film. He is also a professional actor, voice-over artist and educator.
 
Plays include IN TRANSIT (FringeNYC Overall Excellence Award for Outstanding Playwriting), THE AUDIENCE (co-author, Drama Desk nomination for Best New Musical), THE STUDENT (winner, Samuel French OOB Short Play Festival), THE GLINT (Broadway reading starring Beau Bridges, Jean Smart, Michael McKean and SNL's Cecily Strong), THRILLSVILLE (George Street Playhouse reading starring Edie Falco, Richard Kind, Grant Shaud and Adriane Lenox), WHO YOU SEE HERE (La Jolla Playhouse workshop, directed by Christopher Ashley), CHRISTMAS SHORTS (published by Samuel French), SEARCHING FOR GOD IN SUBURBIA (Huntington Theatre Breaking Ground Festival) and more. Five of his short plays have been finalists for the Actors Theatre of Louisville's Heideman Award. He has been in residence at the Ojai Playwrights Conference, the Edward Albee Foundation, and the Berkshire Playwrights Lab. His plays have been produced or developed by (among others) the La Jolla Playhouse, Naked Angels, the Pasadena Playhouse, the Barrow Group, the Huntington Theatre, The Acting Company,  the Lark, Penguin Rep, the SoHo Playhouse, the Transport Group, Iama Theatre Co. (California), City Theatre (Florida), Maples Rep (Missouri), Axial Theatre Company, Bricks Theatre (Wisconsin), Phoenix Theatre (Indiana), Las Vegas Little Theatre (Nevada), Modjeska Playhouse (California), Guild Hall, Blessed Unrest, Miranda Theatre Company, Algonquin Productions and Vital Theatre Company. 
 
As a TV writer, Hoverman won the 2014 Daytime Emmy for Outstanding Writing in an Animated Program and the 2015 Humanitas Prize for Children's Animation for his work on the long-running PBS Kids TV show Arthur. He has also written for Curious George (NBC/Universal), Sofia the First (Disney Jr.), Goldie & Bear (Disney Jr.) and is currently on the staff of Fancy Nancy (Disney Jr.). He co-wrote the screenplay for Any Day Now by Garage Films/Albert Uria; this short film has won 4 awards and is an official selection of over 30 film festivals and counting.
 
Also a classically trained actor, Hoverman has worked with some of the industry's top directors (Joseph Chaikin, John Rando, Anne Bogart, etc.), on national tours (The Acting Company), off-B’way (Women's Project), in major regional theatres (Yale Rep, La Jolla Playhouse), on TV (Late Night w/Conan O’Brien) and in many commercials.  He also provides the voices for several characters on animated series such as Yu-Gi-Oh! and Teenage Mutant Ninja Turtles.
 
A widely respected teacher, Hoverman has midwived the creation of over 200 solo shows in his popular GO-SOLO workshops, including winners of the 2005, 2009, 2010, 2012 & 2013 FringeNYC Best Solo Show Awards.  His teaching is the subject of a NY Times feature article and the documentary SOLO by Shannon Romines.
 
Raised in West Redding, Connecticut by two transplanted Iowans, Hoverman studied playwriting at Brown University in Paula Vogel's graduate workshop as an undergrad (BA in theatre) and acting at the University of California, San Diego (MFA in Acting). 
 
Member: SAG-AFTRA, AEA, ASCAP and the Dramatists Guild.

Partial filmography
 Harlock Saga — Harlock
 Shaman King — King of Sprites, Chris Venstar
 Winx Club (4Kids edit) — Codatorta
 Teenage Mutant Ninja Turtles — Agent Bishop (Season 3)
 One Piece — Higuma, Wapol, Pell
 Yu-Gi-Oh! GX — Mohad, Jagger
 Yu-Gi-Oh! 5D's — Jakob
 Shadow Hearts: From the New World — Natan, Killer

References

External links

Official site

Living people
American male stage actors
American male television actors
American male video game actors
American male voice actors
Male actors from Los Angeles
Brown University alumni
University of California, San Diego alumni
Male actors from Connecticut
20th-century American male actors
21st-century American male actors
Year of birth missing (living people)